Kirchberg an der Murr is a municipality in the district of Rems-Murr in Baden-Württemberg in Germany.

References

Rems-Murr-Kreis